The 2006 Rafael Nadal tennis season started in February as Nadal missed the Australian Open because of a foot injury. Nadal won five singles titles in 2006.

Hard court 
In February, Nadal lost in the semifinals of the first tournament he played, the Open 13 tournament in Marseille, France. Two weeks later, he handed Roger Federer his first loss of the year in the final of the Dubai Duty Free Men's Open (in 2006, Rafael Nadal and Andy Murray were the only two men who defeated Federer). To complete the spring hard-court season, Nadal was upset in the semifinals of the Pacific Life Open in Indian Wells, California, by James Blake, and was upset in the second round of the 2006 Miami Masters.

Clay season 
On European clay, Nadal won all four tournaments he entered and 24 consecutive matches. He defeated Federer in the final of the Masters Series Monte Carlo in four sets. The following week, he defeated Tommy Robredo in the final of the Open Sabadell Atlántico tournament in Barcelona. After a one-week break, Nadal won the Masters Series Internazionali BNL d'Italia in Rome, defeating Federer in a fifth-set tiebreaker in the final, after saving two match points and equaling Björn Borg's tally of 16 ATP titles won as a teenager. Nadal broke Argentinian Guillermo Vilas's 29-year male record of 53 consecutive clay-court match victories by winning his first round match at the French Open. Vilas presented Nadal with a trophy, but commented later that Nadal's feat was less impressive than his own because Nadal's winning streak covered two years and was accomplished by adding easy tournaments to his schedule.

Nadal went on to play Federer in the final of the French Open. The first two sets of the match were hardly competitive, as the rivals traded 6–1 sets. Nadal won the third set easily and served for the match in the fourth set before Federer broke him and forced a tiebreaker. Nadal won the tiebreaker and became the first player to defeat Federer in a Grand Slam tournament final.

Nadal injured his shoulder while playing a quarterfinal match against Lleyton Hewitt at the Artois Championships, played on grass at the Queen's Club in London. Nadal was unable to complete the match, which ended his 26-match winning streak.

Wimbledon 
Nadal was seeded second at Wimbledon, but was two points from defeat against American qualifier Robert Kendrick in the second round before coming back to win in five sets. In the third round, Nadal defeated world No. 20 Andre Agassi in straight sets in Agassi's last career match at Wimbledon. Nadal also won his next three matches in straight sets, which set up his first Wimbledon final, which was against Federer, who had won this tournament the three previous years. Nadal was the first Spanish man since Manuel Santana in 1966, to reach the Wimbledon final, but Federer won the match in four sets to win his fourth consecutive Wimbledon title.

US Open Series 
During the lead up to the US Open, Nadal played the two Masters Series tournaments in North America. He was upset in the third round of the Rogers Cup in Toronto and the quarterfinals of the Western & Southern Financial Group Masters in Cincinnati. Nadal was seeded second at the US Open, but lost in the quarterfinals to world No. 54 Mikhail Youzhny of Russia in four sets.

Nadal played only three tournaments the remainder of the year. Joachim Johansson, ranked world No. 690, upset Nadal in the second round of the Stockholm Open. The following week, Nadal lost to Tomáš Berdych in the quarterfinals of the year's last Masters Series tournament, the Mutua Madrileña Masters in Madrid. During the round-robin stage of the year-ending Tennis Masters Cup, Nadal lost to James Blake but defeated Nikolay Davydenko and Robredo. Because of those two victories, Nadal qualified for the semifinals, where he lost to Federer. This was Nadal's third loss in nine career matches with Federer.

Singles matches

Year end ranking 
Nadal went on to become the first player since Andre Agassi in 1994–95 to finish the year as the world No. 2 in consecutive years.

See also
 2006 ATP Tour
 2006 Roger Federer tennis season

References

External links 
  
 ATP tour profile

Rafael Nadal tennis seasons
Nadal
Nadal
2006 in Spanish sport